Nicholas of Capraia (died 1274) was the Judge of Arborea from 1264 to his assassination ten years later.

Nicholas was the eldest son and successor of William of Capraia, who had usurped the judicial office of Arborea from Marianus II in 1255. On William's death in 1264, Nicholas took up his authority, but he was imprisoned by Marianus in 1270 and remained in prison until Marianus decided to remove him permanently in 1274. His cousin Anselm tried to take his authority back in Cagliari.

1274 deaths
Judges (judikes) of Arborea
Year of birth unknown